Stadtlengsfeld is a town and a former municipality in the Wartburgkreis district of Thuringia, Germany. Since 1 January 2019, it is part of the municipality Dermbach. It is situated in the Rhön Mountains, 8 km southwest of Bad Salzungen.

History
Within the German Empire (1871-1918), Stadtlengsfeld was part of the Grand Duchy of Saxe-Weimar-Eisenach.

It was the site of the Menzengraben mining accident in 1953.

Sister cities
 Kiskőrös, Hungary

External links

References

Wartburgkreis
Grand Duchy of Saxe-Weimar-Eisenach
Former municipalities in Thuringia